Morbid Angel is an American death metal band based in Tampa, Florida, formed in 1983 by guitarist, primary composer and sole remaining original member Trey Azagthoth, vocalist and bassist Dallas Ward, and drummer Mike Browning. Widely considered one of the most influential and established death metal bands and an important transition of death metal from its thrash metal roots, they were one of the first bands to incorporate guttural vocals, up-tempo blast beats, multiple tempo changes and a dark atmosphere. They have been described as one of "the most influential and emulated bands in death metal", alongside Obituary, Death, Cynic, Autopsy and Deicide, and have been cited as an influence by many later bands. They were also the first death metal band to experience commercial success in connection with being signed to Giant Records in 1992, heavy rotation of their music videos on MTV, and having the music video for the song "God of Emptiness" shown on an episode of Beavis and Butt-Head. Their first three studio albums – Altars of Madness (1989), Blessed Are the Sick (1991), and Covenant (1993) – remain staples of death metal.

British music magazine Terrorizer ranked Altars of Madness first in its list "Top 40 greatest death metal albums". Decibel magazine also rated guitarist Trey Azagthoth as the number one "death metal guitarist ever". The band's songs are complex in arrangement, owing to the considerable technical skills of both Azagthoth as well as drummer Pete Sandoval, the latter of whom also played in the grindcore band Terrorizer. According to Nielsen SoundScan, Morbid Angel is the third best-selling death metal band in the United States (after Cannibal Corpse and Deicide up until 2003 with sales of over 445,000), with their third album Covenant being the best-selling death metal album of the Soundscan era with over 150,000 units sold.

The band's original lyrical themes, when helmed by Vincent (and Azagthoth and Browning respectively) focused mostly on Satanism, occultism and blasphemous subject matter, but from Formulas Fatal to the Flesh onward, via Azagthoth's influence, the lyrics moved toward the ancient Sumerian gods. Much of this is a nod to the Simon Necronomicon, which was influenced by Sumerian mythology, the author H. P. Lovecraft, and fascination with the Roman Empire, and during Steve Tucker's tenure they take on more anti-religious and barbaric themes, namely of the strong overcoming the weak.  Their albums are notable for being released in alphabetical order, with guitarist Trey Azagthoth commenting that it was a coincidence regarding the first two albums, but that it has been done consciously since then.

History

Formation, demos, and Altars of Madness (1983–1990)
Morbid Angel was formed in 1983 in Tampa, Florida by guitarist Trey Azagthoth and drummer/vocalist Mike Browning. In the early stages of their career the band developed a reputation for "gruesome stage antics". They quickly became highly influential in the formation of the Florida death metal scene, inspiring other highly influential acts such as Obituary. They recorded their debut album, Abominations of Desolation, in 1986, but the band was unsatisfied with the final product and it remained unreleased until 1991, printing 10,000 copies. In 1986, David Vincent joined the band, replacing Michael Manson and Sterling von Scarborough as vocalist and bassist respectively. Fellow Terrorizer member, drummer Pete Sandoval, soon followed. The band made their debut in 1987 on the New Renaissance Records record label.

Their first studio album, Altars of Madness, was released in 1989, and is regarded by many as one of the most important death metal albums of all time. Music journalist Jason Birchmeier writes that:Few albums struck a chord within the ears and minds of the late-'80s underground metal scene like Morbid Angel's Altars of Madness did at the end of the decade, setting a new precedent for metal bands to reach. With the arguable exception of Chuck Schuldiner's Death, never before had a heavy metal band carried their lightning-fast guitar riffs and equally spellbinding guitar solos into such horrific territory. Venom and Slayer redefined the extent to which a metal band could align itself with all things evil during the beginning of the decade, but Morbid Angel made these two groups sound like children's music compared to the Florida-based group's assaulting death metal sounds and their blasphemous lyrics.

Morbid Angel toured for nearly two years in support of Altars of Madness. The tour started in November 1989 when they opened for Napalm Death and Bolt Thrower in the UK and Europe. Most of 1990 and 1991 were spent touring North America, playing with bands such as Pantera, Obituary, Atheist, Death Angel, Forbidden, Sanctuary, Ripping Corpse, Deicide, Sacrifice and Wrath. The Altars of Madness tour ended in April 1991 with a Brazilian tour, supported by Sarcófago, Sextrash and Cambio Negro.

Rise to success (1991–1995)
In 1991, Morbid Angel released their second album, Blessed Are the Sick, which was met with widespread critical acclaim, and is considered by many to be a landmark release in the death metal genre. Morbid Angel toured worldwide in support of Blessed Are the Sick throughout 1991 and 1992, headlining a European tour with Sadus, Cathedral, Godflesh and Unleashed, a North American tour (also supported by Unleashed) and then a European tour with Entombed and Unleashed. They also were one of the opening acts (along with Kreator, Sepultura, Headhunter and Wolfsbane) for Motörhead on the "Christmas Metal Meetings '91" tour, and toured Australia for the first time.

Following the success of Altars of Madness and Blessed Are the Sick, Morbid Angel were signed by Irving Azoff to Giant Records for one album, with the option of five more. In late 1992, second guitarist Richard Brunelle was kicked out of the band due to alleged substance abuse; instead of replacing him, Morbid Angel moved on as a three-piece.

On June 22, 1993, the band released their third full-length album Covenant, which went on to sell over 150,000 copies in the United States alone. Their record label dedicated promotional resources to the album, and commissioned music videos for the songs "Rapture" and "God of Emptiness". These music videos were put on heavy rotation by MTV, and the latter also appeared on the television show Beavis and Butt-head. The success of the album enabled the band to tour with Black Sabbath and Motörhead across the United States from February through March 1994, which David Vincent credits with helping the band significantly expand their audience. Morbid Angel also toured North America with Kreator and Paradise Lost, and Europe with Grave and Dismember.

The band released its fourth studio album, Domination, on May 9, 1995, which featured new guitarist Erik Rutan of Ripping Corpse. It proved to be a somewhat controversial album among fans, featuring a slower, more atmospheric and experimental sound than on previous albums. AllMusic describes the album's sound as "more groove-oriented". The album has gone on to sell over 100,000 copies in the United States alone. Regardless, following the release of the album, their record label dropped them from their roster.

Steve Tucker era (1996–2003)
In 1996, shortly after the release of their live album titled Entangled in Chaos, bassist/vocalist David Vincent departed the band and was replaced by Steve Tucker. They released their fifth full-length album Formulas Fatal to the Flesh in 1998, which was considered more aggressive and complex than their previous album Domination. With Tucker, the band went on to release Gateways to Annihilation and Heretic in 2000 and 2003 respectively. Tucker briefly left Morbid Angel in 2001 and was replaced by former Hate Eternal bassist and vocalist Jared Anderson. That year, the band joined Pantera, Skrape, Slayer and Static-X on the Extreme Steel Tour of North America, which was Pantera's last major tour.

In 2002, Anderson left the band and Tucker re-assumed his position as bassist and vocalist.

Reunion with David Vincent (2004–2014)

In 2004, Steve Tucker once again left the band, paving the way for former vocalist/bassist David Vincent to return. The band continued by touring and playing festivals such as Wacken Open Air in 2006.

Morbid Angel's appearance on some of the mid-summer 2008 European festivals was announced as a "short break from writing and pre-production of their new 8th studio album". In May 2008, it was announced that Destructhor from Zyklon would be the band's new guitarist, and Destructhor would appear on the new album.

On March 18, 2010, the band announced that Tim Yeung would play drums on the upcoming album, allowing Pete Sandoval to recover from back surgery. On June 22, the band entered the studio to begin the recording of their new full-length album. On March 5, 2011, the band headlined the Scion Rock Fest in Pomona, California. This performance was their first in the US in six years, aside from a one-off show in Los Angeles in May 2009. On March 9, Morbid Angel confirmed that their new album would be called Illud Divinum Insanus. The album was released on June 7 via Season of Mist. The album incorporated electronic sounds and deviated from the usual sound of the band. In an interview in December 2013, David Vincent confirmed that Pete Sandoval is no longer a member of the band, claiming that Sandoval had "found Jesus", and stating, "Pete Sandoval and Morbid Angel are not compatible", laying to rest speculation that Sandoval would eventually be returning to the band.

Asked in a December 2014 interview about Morbid Angel's plans for 2015, Vincent replied, "We're done [touring] for awhile. It's time to write." Yeung said that the band was in talks of recording an EP.

Reunion with Steve Tucker (2015–present)
On June 15, 2015, it was reported that David Vincent and Tim Yeung were no longer in Morbid Angel. Former vocalist/bassist Steve Tucker shortly rejoined the band once again, while a replacement drummer, Scott Fuller, joined in 2017. Later that day, however, Vincent denied that he had left the band. On his official Facebook page, Tucker hinted in a post on June 17 that Destructhor was no longer part of Morbid Angel either: "Who will play second guitar? Time will answer that one ..." On June 18, this was confirmed, as Destructhor announced his departure from the band to focus on the Norwegian death metal band Myrkskog. The next day, Vincent confirmed his departure due to creative differences. Both he and Yeung teamed up together in late 2016 to form the band I Am Morbid. On August 3, Morbid Angel was signed to UDR Music and was at work on a new studio album, which would be released in 2017, with a tour to follow.

On January 9, 2017, Trey Azagthoth announced on his Facebook page that Scott Fuller from Annihilated joined Morbid Angel for the recording of their new album. Additional details indicated that the album title would presumably start with the letter "K", given the band's history on naming their albums alphabetically. The next day, the band announced that they had hired Dan Vadim Von from Vadimvon as their second guitarist. They also announced a U.S. tour with Suffocation, Revocation and Withered, which would begin in late May and continue into late June. In a March interview on The Metal Magdalene with Jet show on Metal Messiah Radio, Steve Tucker explained that the album would be a "death metal album". When speaking to Orlando Weekly in May 2017, Tucker said that the tour setlist would not feature any David Vincent era material and would then perform songs featuring him instead. He also said that they would play "probably one or two new songs" from the new album, in which he said that it was "almost done, but we don't want to put out too much with YouTube putting it up the next day." On the opening night on May 23, they performed a new song entitled "Warped". Morbid Angel canceled their European appearance twice due to passport issues from one of the members. The band's management explained that a new passport would not be issued in time for the shows. The band expressed disappointment with the news and issued an apology. On October 5, the cover artwork for the forthcoming album titled Kingdoms Disdained was revealed, which was released on December 1 by Silver Lining Music. Later that day, the brand new song "Piles of Little Arms" was made available for streaming, followed by "For No Master" on November 29.

Morbid Angel toured the U.S. in the spring of 2018 with Misery Index and Origin, performing on separate legs. Two additional bands Dreaming Dead and Hate Storm Annihilation were added as additional support. In early 2019, Morbid Angel and Cannibal Corpse toured together for the first time ever, promoted by heavy metal magazine Decibel, with Necrot and Blood Incantation as additional support. Immolation replaced Cannibal Corpse for the final week of the tour.

In a February 2019 interview with Metal Wani, Tucker stated that Morbid Angel was planning to begin working on a new album that year: "I'm gonna actually start writing some new music, and I think Trey will probably start writing some new music. We'll probably do a couple of more tours throughout the year. We have some stuff that's being talked about now, but nothing concrete. It's that time. It's been a little bit over a year since the last album came out. I've kind of got the urge and desire myself to write some more music. So we'll start getting into that and continue doing shows." In March 2019, Morbid Angel appeared on the Adult Swim television series FishCenter Live.

In celebration of their 40th anniversary, Morbid Angel will embark on a five-week North American tour called the United States Tour of Terror in March–April 2023.

Legacy 
Morbid Angel have been one of the most highly influential bands in the growth and development of death metal along with death metal band Cannibal Corpse. Former guitarist Erik Rutan went on to form the successful death metal band Hate Eternal, while the South Carolina band Nile have gone on to enjoy significant levels of success in a similar style of death metal. Their sound has also heavily influenced the growth and development of death metal and black metal in South America, as well as of the early black metal scene in Norway. Many bands have cited Morbid Angel as an influence on their own music, including Obituary, Immortal, Krisiun, Gorguts, Behemoth, Dead Congregation, Gojira, Opeth, Pyrrhon, Revocation, and many others. Their early release Abominations of Desolation as well as Altars of Madness are considered two of the earliest true examples of death metal, as well as two of the most boundary-pushing albums of their time in terms of extremity. Metalsucks named them one of the most important bands of the 1990s, writing that "The band released three seminal albums — Blessed are the Sick, Covenant, and Domination — between 1991 and 1995 alone (and there are definitely fans who'd say we're being unfair to 1998's Formulas Fatal to the Flesh). And thanks to a little show called Beavis and Butt-Head, Morbid Angel became death metal's ambassadors to the outside world, acting as the gateway drug for who even knows how many scores of kids."

Guitarist Trey Azagthoth is one of the most influential and widely revered guitarists in heavy metal. Loudwire named him one of the top 10 rock and metal "riff lords", writing that "Trey Azagthoth left his fingerprints all over the early death metal scene with a unique riffing style still unmatched within the genre today. ... His unconventional style sounds haphazard in its approach, awkwardly stepping over piles of rubbles left from previous riffing attacks, but with crushing effect." VH1 has described him as "a unique and thrilling lead player more following in the adventurous footsteps of Eddie Van Halen than a stiff tactician. Bands like Hate Eternal and Nile have used the now common death metal language that Morbid Angel commenced. Their influence is most clearly represented by current Metal heavyweight, Gojira." SPIN wrote that "he has blazed a tension-filled style all his own" and that "when he solos, he enters a mystical mind state he calls the "Temple of Ostx". During the nineties the band were one of a number of bands involved in the scare created around death metal, and were featured in a news report about the issue due to the band's overtly Satanic and occult lyrics and imagery.

Musical style 
Morbid Angel's style of music has undergone a number of changes throughout their musical career. The band's sound is characterised by harsh, growled vocals, technically complex guitarwork that frequently makes use of fast tremolo-picking and palm-muted riffs. Azagthoth's guitarwork is a core part of the band's sound, with his atonal "shredding" style being likened to the guitar work in Slayer. Pete Sandoval's work behind the drums has also been crucial to the band's sound, and "is known for his great double bass drum speed and technical proficiency" and as one of the fastest drummers in metal. In addition, "Sandoval is also among the first extreme metal drummers to champion the use of acoustic drum triggers." On their early albums, they pushed metal to its most extreme level, musically and lyrically. The band has evolved their anti-Christian lyrical themes from these early works. On Altars of Madness, the lyrics largely consist of simple blasphemous and overtly Satanic proclamations. However, the sophistication and depth of the lyrics has grown over time. On their 1993 album Covenant, the band articulate more broadly anti-theistic lyrics, and profess "anger at a higher power". Today, "the band's lyrics are even more philosophical and thought-provoking. Current lyricist Trey Azagthoth has diagramed his personal ideology in the album Formulas Fatal to the Flesh. His stance is blasphemous and non-traditional, but hardly evil."

Members

Current members
Trey Azagthoth – guitars, keyboards 
Steve Tucker – bass, vocals 
Scott Fuller – drums 
Dan Vadim Von – guitars

Discography

Studio albums

Live albums

Compilation albums

Demo albums

EPs

Singles

Music videos

References

External links

Official website
Extensive interview with Trey (May 1999)

Death metal musical groups from Florida
1984 establishments in Florida
Critics of religions
Earache Records artists
Giant Records (Warner) artists
Musical groups established in 1984
Musical groups from Tampa, Florida
Musical quartets
Relativity Records artists
Season of Mist artists